is a female long-distance runner from Japan, who won the 2009 edition of the annual Nagoya Marathon on March 1, 2009, clocking a total time of 2:28:13. She is a one-time national champion in the women's 5,000 metres.

Achievements

References

ARRS

1981 births
Living people
Japanese female long-distance runners
Japanese female marathon runners
Universiade medalists in athletics (track and field)
Universiade silver medalists for Japan
Universiade bronze medalists for Japan
Medalists at the 2001 Summer Universiade
World Athletics Championships athletes for Japan
20th-century Japanese women
21st-century Japanese women